Sloper may refer to

Ally Sloper, early comic strip character
BSA Sloper, British motorcycle 
Lindsay Sloper (1826–1887), English pianist
Robert Sloper (1729–1802), British general
Sloper antenna, a type of radio antenna
Sloper pattern, see pattern (sewing)
A type of climbing hold, see Glossary of climbing terms